Erich Brabec (born 24 February 1977) is a Czech football manager and a former player. Since March 2023 Brabec is chair of the Czech Women's Football section FAČR.

Club career
Brabec joined Dynamo Moscow in 2002, after receiving an offer on 18 December 2001. He left for Alania Vladikavkaz in July 2003.

International
He has played in one international match for the Czech Republic in the 2000 Olympic Games.

Coaching career
On 11 October 2019, Brabec was appointed assistant manager of Luděk Klusáček at Bohemians 1905.

References

External links
 
 
 

Living people
1977 births
Sportspeople from České Budějovice
Association football central defenders
Czech footballers
Association football defenders
Czech expatriate footballers
Czech Republic youth international footballers
Czech Republic under-21 international footballers
Czech Republic international footballers
FK Drnovice players
FC Dynamo Moscow players
FC Spartak Vladikavkaz players
Kayserispor footballers
MKE Ankaragücü footballers
Ankaraspor footballers
FC Aarau players
SK Slavia Prague players
AC Sparta Prague players
SK Dynamo České Budějovice players
FK Senica players
Bohemians 1905 players
Russian Premier League players
Swiss Super League players
Süper Lig players
Czech First League players
Slovak Super Liga players
Footballers at the 2000 Summer Olympics
Olympic footballers of the Czech Republic
Czech expatriate sportspeople in Russia
Czech expatriate sportspeople in Turkey
Czech expatriate sportspeople in Switzerland
Czech expatriate sportspeople in Austria
Czech expatriate sportspeople in Slovakia
Expatriate footballers in Russia
Expatriate footballers in Turkey
Expatriate footballers in Switzerland
Expatriate footballers in Austria
Expatriate footballers in Slovakia
Czech football managers
FC Sellier & Bellot Vlašim managers
Czech National Football League managers